The Vauxhall 23-60 is a four or five-seater touring car manufactured by Vauxhall of Luton that was announced in July 1922. The 23-60's standard tourer Kington body was described as "preserving that greyhound look so characteristic of the Vauxhall car". It shared many parts with Vauxhall's much more powerful 30-98.

The 23-60 replaced the Vauxhall 25 which had given sterling service during World War I and from which the 23-60 was developed. Its reliability made Vauxhall's name for dependability. The 23-60 remained in production until the introduction of the ultra-smooth six-cylinder Burt-McCollum type single-sleeve-valve Vauxhall 25-70 was announced in October 1925. General Motors took control of Vauxhall 16 November 1925.

Design and specifications

Controls
The hand-operated gear and rear-wheel brake controls are on the driver's right but there is a door for the driver which there was not on the 30-98 or 25. The spark and throttle levers are on the steering wheel together with an air lever working a valve in the induction pipe (after the throttle). There is also a mixture control (choke) on the dash. Gear and brake levers are well to hand. Accelerator and (transmission) brake pedals were set close together.

The hood is of the all-weather type and its door sections are carried in an envelope stored behind the back squab.

Large tools are kept in the footrest and there is a specially fitted tool cupboard in the near-side running board.

Engine
The engine is essentially the four-cylinder engine of the preceding 25 hp car which chief engineer C E King had modified adding an overhead valve head and, because such largish engines now usually had six-cylinders for smoothness, the harmonic balancer invented by Dr F W Lanchester at the centre of its crankshaft.

The dynamo is driven from the clutch casing so it is generating while the engine is running. The nearside of the engine carries the generator and magneto, the carburettor and its water-heated induction pipe with a proper hot-spot and the vacuum tank on the dash. The offside of the engine has the starter, steering-box, exhaust manifold, oil-dipper gauge and oil filler. The water connection between the lower casting and the cylinder head is through large external aluminium ports so there is a single compression joint between castings.

Lanchester harmonic balancer
The Lanchester harmonic balancer on the crankshaft has two weighted drums driven at twice crankshaft speed, one by a helical gear wheel attached to the crankshaft and the other by the primary drum. In a four-cylinder engine unbalanced secondary forces occur twice in each crankshaft revolution. The harmonic balancer counteracts any tendency to undesirable vibration. 

Few surviving cars retain the balancer.

Transmission
There is a right hand gear-change lever
The clutch's thrust and withdrawal races are oiled by hand and it is necessary to unscrew the alloy front floorboards for access but the gearbox has a quickly detachable filler. The multiplate clutch is run with graphite and coupled by a fabric joint to the 4-speed gearbox then to the spiral-bevel driven rear axle located by torque girders

Chassis

The chassis with its mechanicals was guaranteed for three years.

Brakes
The foot brake operates on the transmission and the lever brakes on the rear wheels. Both sets are of the internal expanding type. The adjustment for wear of the foot brake may be made by hand but adjustment of the rear brakes requires a spanner. 

Twelve months later front brakes were made available on new cars for a further £55. A year later again they were standardised on the 23-60 in July 1924 along with a redesigned front axle, springs and saddle-plate. Operated by the foot pedal the front brakes and the transmission brake were linked, the latter being given a slight lead. The brakes on the rear wheels were independently controlled by the handbrake lever.

For more information on Vauxhall brakes performance see 30-98

Steering
Steering was by worm and wheel.

Suspension
By half-elliptical springs in front and behind.

Catalogued bodies

6 October 1922
 £695 Chassis with full equipment
 £895 Kington five-seater
 £1,145 Arundel all-weather
 £1,220 Salisbury limousine
 £1,270 Carlton pullman
 £1,195 Warwick landaulette
 £1,175 Grosvenor saloon
 £1,275 Winchester saloon
 £1,200 Sutherland cabriolet
 £1,300 Langham enclosed landaulette

References

External links
 Restoration
 YouTube video

23-60
Vehicles introduced in 1922
1920s cars
Rear-wheel-drive vehicles